Aubrey "Aub" Lawson (born 5 April 1914 in Kelly's Gully, Warialda, New South Wales - died 20 January 1977) was an Australian international speedway rider who featured in ten World Championship finals including the 1939 final which was never run due to the outbreak of World War II.

Career
Lawson first came to the UK in 1939 and rode in two leagues for the Wembley Lions and Middlesbrough Bears but at his mother's insistence, his sister accompanied him as chaperone.

It was not until after the war in 1947 that he returned to the UK when league racing started again. He joined the West Ham Hammers where he stayed for five seasons, top scoring in three of them. In 1951 he won the London Riders' Championship whilst riding for the Hammers. After a year back in Australia he returned to the UK where he joined the Norwich Stars, where he remained until he retired from racing in 1960. Lawson then returned to Australia where he continued racing in Sydney, winning his then record 5th NSW Championship in 1963, adding to those he had won in 1948, 1950, 1953 and 1954.

World final appearances
 1939 -  London, Wembley Stadium - Event cancelled due to World War II
 1949 -  London, Wembley Stadium - 8th - 8pts
 1950 -  London, Wembley Stadium - 4th - 10pts
 1951 -  London, Wembley Stadium - 10th - 7pts
 1953 -  London, Wembley Stadium - 9th - 7pts
 1954 -  London, Wembley Stadium - 14th - 4pts
 1957 -  London, Wembley Stadium - 4th - 11pts
 1958 -  London, Wembley Stadium - 3rd - 11pts
 1959 -  London, Wembley Stadium - 5th - 11pts
 1960 -  London, Wembley Stadium - 14th - 4pts

References

External links
 Lawson, Aubrey  (1914 - 1977)

1914 births
1977 deaths
Australian speedway riders
People from New South Wales
Wembley Lions riders
West Ham Hammers riders
Norwich Stars riders